Crosman Corporation is an American designer, manufacturer and supplier of shooting sport products, with a long-standing presence in airgun design and a tradition of producing pellet and BB guns.  Crosman is also a producer of many varieties of airgun and airsoft ammunition and  Powerlet cartridges.  In addition, Crosman sells branded, licensed products as well as a variety of airsoft guns.

History 
Crosman was incorporated in 1924 as Crosman Rifle Company, after the sale of "Crosman Brothers" to Frank Hahn.  The firm was based in Fairport, New York, a suburb of Rochester (from the print on the bottom of free vintage targets available as a pdf on the company's website).  In 1960 it was acquired by Bangor Punta Corp.  In 1970, the company moved to a small town in the finger lakes region, East Bloomfield.

Crosman's first models were the traditional American multi-pump pneumatic design, where 3 to 10 pumps would pressurize a reservoir for each shot.  Descendants of these original models are still made, in rifle, pistol and carbine form, and they remain quite popular.  In 1992, Crosman acquired the Benjamin Sheridan company's assets.

From 1971 through 1989, Coleman of Wichita, Kansas owned Crosman.  In 1989, MacAndrews & Forbes Holdings of New York acquired Coleman and sold Crosman to Worldwide Sports and Recreation.  In 1997, an investment group headed by Leonard Pickett purchased the company.  Pickett was named CEO and held that position until his death in 2000.  Ken D'Arcy served as CEO from 1997 to 2012.

In 2011 Wellspring Capital Management purchased Crosman and in August 2012 Phil Dolci was named CEO and served until May 2015.  Brad Johnson was named as Executive Chairman and Interim CEO while remaining Chairman & CEO of United Sporting Companies, a separate company that is also part of the Wellspring portfolio.

In June 2017 Wellspring sold Crosman to Compass Diversified Holdings, INC (NYSE: CODI). Upon the sale of the company, Robert Beckwith was appointed the new CEO.  Robert had previously been the CFO under Brad Johnson.

Benjamin 
In 1882, Walter R. Benjamin of St. Louis, Missouri, introduced the first Benjamin air rifle. These Benjamin Pump guns were manufactured by the Wissler Instrument Co. of St. Louis under a U.S. patent that had been issued to Benjamin.  Unlike many air guns of this period, the Benjamin was intended not as a toy, but as a high-power compressed air gun in which pressure was built up by pumping a built-in piston located beneath the barrel.

The Benjamin Air Rifle Company was formed in 1902 when Walter R. Benjamin purchased the patent rights from the defunct St. Louis Air Rifle Company.  Production from 1902 to 1904 and from 1906 to 1986 was in St. Louis.  In 1977, the Benjamin Air Rifle Company purchased Sheridan Products in Racine, Wisconsin.  Benjamin and Sheridan were acquired by Crosman in 1992.  By 2015, Benjamin was positioned as Crosman Corporation's adult hunting and high performance line and Sheridan had its name on one model: the Cowboy, a youth-oriented lever action.

CO2 
In the 1930s, Crosman began to experiment with CO2 power.  Like other CO2 guns of the day, they were bulk fill, which meant that liquid CO2 was loaded into a pressurized reservoir on the gun.  Other manufacturers started to use 8 gram CO2 bulbs used in soda dispensers.  Crosman capitalized on this in 1954  by introducing a new 12 gram CO2 bulb, called a Powerlet.  The new Powerlet gave more shots per bulb than the soda bulb, and with the addition of a simple spacer, a Powerlet gun could use the shorter 8 gram bulb.

Powerlet 

A Powerlet cartridge, commonly referred to as a  charger, is a small disposable metal gas cylinder holding  of liquid  and often a small quantity of lubricating oil, used as a pneumatic power source for certain air guns, airsoft guns, paintball guns, carbonation, and for quick inflation of various devices such as a personal flotation device.  Originally developed and the trademark owned by Crosman Corporation and introduced to the market in 1954, the Powerlet  cartridge has become the dominant source of power for inexpensive, rapid fire air guns from many manufacturers.

Typically manufactured from the same steel alloys and using the same metal spinning fabrication processes as much larger refillable gas cylinders, a Powerlet cartridge typically provides 20 to 40 shots in an airgun, depending on the gun and environmental conditions. The first 10 shots from a new bottle are consistent, with subsequent shots losing power.  For paintball markers, fewer shots are produced due to the greater weight of the paintball compared to an airgun projectile.

For modern paintball guns, this technology is considered outdated, as they cannot fire as many shots as a modern large-capacity  tank can provide, though some still use Powerlet cartridges for stock paintball.  They are also still favored for paintball pistols, for players wishing to run "light" with considerably less weight.  Because liquid  needs to vaporize to gaseous form to be usable, latent heat is absorbed every time a shot is discharged, cooling the cannister.  When discharging repeatedly, the temperature within the Powerlet cannister can drop low enough to affect the vapor-liquid equilibrium and reduce the vapor pressure significantly.  The drop in output pressure (known as the "working pressure") not only can affect the ballistic performance, but also can cause the gun to "freeze up" and cease operating completely due to insufficient pneumatic force, until the cannister warms back up again.  This causes a problem due to the rapid-fire nature of many competitive paintball skirmishes, so the high-pressure air (HPA, or "N2") systems are more commonly used.

In 2004, Crosman introduced a new disposable CO2 power source, the 88 gram AirSource.

Current models

Air pistols 
 1377 "American Classic" pneumatic
 1322 "Medalist" pneumatic
 Stinger P311
 2240 CO2 pistol
 2300S CO2 pistol
 2300T CO2 pistol
 2300KT custom CO2 pistol
 3576 CO2 revolver (previously available in .50 paintball and 6 mm airsoft)
 1008 "Repeatair" CO2 pistol
 T4 CO2 pistol (Modeled after Glock series)
 Pro 77 CO2 pistol
 C11 CO2 pistol (Modeled after the Beretta 8000 series)
 C21 CO2 pistol
 C41 CO2 pistol
 Marauder PCP
 Vigilante CO2
 USMC MOS 5811 Military Police (Not released as of 3/15/14)
 Wildcat
 Maximus PCP
 Marauder Woods Walker
 Trail NP Break Barrel Pistol
 1720T Target PCP Pistol
 PC77 Pumpmaster Classic (Previously a Walmart special)
 1701P Silhouette PCP Pistol
 1911 BB CO2 Pistol
 TAC 1911 BB CO2 Pistol
 GI MODEL 1911BBb CO2 Pistol
 Survivalist CO2 Pistol

Air rifles

Spring-piston 
 Fury II Blackout
 Marlin® Classic (BB)
 Optimus
 Phantom 1000
 Phantom 1000x
 Phantom 500 (.22) (Canadian version, 495FPS)
 Quest 500x (Canadian version, 495fps)
 Raven

Nitro Piston 
 Crusher
 DPMS Classic A4 Nitro Piston
 Fire NP
 Fury NP
 Genesis NP
 Incursion Nitro Piston
 Jim Shockey Steel Eagle
 Eva Shockey Golden Eagle
 Mayhem
 Nitro Venom
 Nitro Venom Dusk
 Phantom NP
 Phoenix
 Rogue
 Shockwave NP
 Silver Fox Nitro Piston
 Stealth Shot Nitro Piston
 MTR77NP*
 TR77NP*
 Vantage NP
 Varmint power pack
 Benjamin Genesis
 Benjamin NPS
 Benjamin Prowler
 Benjamin Summit
 Benjamin Titan NP*
 Benjamin Titan XS
 Benjamin Trail NP*
 Benjamin Trail NP XL*
 Benjamin Trail NP2*
 Benjamin Trail NP2 Synthetic

Pump pneumatic 
 664x Powermaster (Walmart special)
 760 Pumpmaster*
 2100 Classic
 2289 pneumatic rifle (Sold in Doomsday pack)
 AirMaster
 Bushmaster ACR Dual Ammo Air Rifle
 Cowboy
 M4-177*
 MK-177
 Legacy (Jim Shockey Signature Series)*
 Powermaster 66 Kit
 Recruit
 Torrent SX
 USMC MOS 0311 Rifleman
 Benjamin 392
 Benjamin 397
-  766 American Classic 1-3

PCP 
 Armada
 Bulldog*
 Challenger*
 Marauder*
 Maximus*
 MAR177 PCP conversion Kit  (Fits on an AR lower)
 Wildfire
 Pioneer Airbow
 Benjamin Discovery*

CO2 
 1077 "RepeatAir" CO2 rifle with 12-round magazine and plastic stock (extremely quiet, popular in Europe due to cramped parcel sizes)
 2400KT custom shop CO2 carbine
 Comrade AK
 MK-45
 Heritage 2260 (Limited Edition)
 Outdoorsman Carbine
 Full & semi Auto R1
 DPMS SBR
 MPW Bushmaster

Includes Variants*

Airsoft guns 
 Spring Rifles: Stinger R32 (Modeled after H&K G36C), Stinger R34 (Modeled after the M-4), Sniper R38, (Modeled after Colt Model 653 M16A1 carbine), Stinger R39 (Modeled after Knight's PDW)
 Spring Pistols: Stinger P32, Stinger P36, Stinger P9, P312, P311, p312kt Stinger P30, Walther P22, and Walther P99
 Spring Shotguns: Stinger S32p (Modeled after M87SA), Stinger S30, Stinger s34p Wingmaster and Remington TAC-1
 Electric Rifles: Pulse R70 (Modeled after M4 SOPMOD), Pulse R72 (Modeled after H&K G3A3), Pulse R73(Modelled after the AR-15), Pulse R74, NightProwler SA (Modeled after Beretta Cx4 Storm), Pulse R71 (Modeled after H&K MP5 RAS), Tac R71 (Modeled after H&k mp5k) Pulse R76 (Modeled after the Russian AK74U). Pulse R78 (modeled after the M4). The Newest AEG gun crosman came out with.
 Electric Pistols: Pulse p50 and the Pulse p72, and the Colt M1911
 Gas Pistols: Air Mag M50 (Modeled after Micro Uzi), Air Mag P50, Crosman Air Mag C11 (Modeled after Beretta 9000s)
 Sub-Machine Guns: Pulse M70, Stinger R36 (Modeled after H&K UMP) Pulse R74 (Modeled after H&K MP5), Pulse R75 (Modeled after the American 180)
 Nightstalker

Crosman has manufactured and sold the Benjamin-Sheridan and Sheridan model airguns for many years.  These models are still made to the higher quality standards of the originals, with wood stocks and primarily brass and steel components.  The Sheridan line is strictly 5 mm (.20 caliber), while the Benjamin-Sheridan models are available in .177 (4.5 mm, .22 (5.56 mm), .25 (6.4 mm) and .357 (9.0 mm) calibers, depending on model.

References 

 Answers.com Article Article about Crosman corporate history
 Vintage targets Shows Fairport location, target bottom
 Interview of Crosman CEO Ken D'Arcy
• NRA Museums: Benjamin history
• Blue Book of Airgun Values – BENJAMIN AIR RIFLE COMPANY (BENJAMIN) BENJAMIN AIR RIFLE COMPANY BACKGROUND Benjamin History

External links 
 

Pneumatic weapons
Hunting equipment
Airsoft
Manufacturing companies established in 1924
1924 establishments in New York (state)